Hyla savignyi, also known as the Savigny's treefrog,  lemon-yellow tree frog, and Middle East tree frog, is a species of frog in the family Hylidae. The species is endemic to the Middle East, where it has been declared an endangered species.

Etymology
The specific name, savignyi, is in honor of French zoologist Marie Jules César Savigny.

Geographic range
H. savignyi is found in Armenia, Azerbaijan, Cyprus, Egypt, Georgia, Iran, Iraq, Israel, Jordan, Lebanon, Saudi Arabia, Syria, Turkey, and Yemen.

Habitat
The natural habitats of the Middle East tree frog are temperate shrubland, subtropical or tropical dry shrubland, Mediterranean-type shrubby vegetation, temperate grassland, subtropical or tropical dry lowland grassland, rivers, freshwater lakes, intermittent freshwater lakes, freshwater marshes, intermittent freshwater marshes, freshwater springs, temperate desert, arable land, rural gardens, canals and ditches, and introduced vegetation.

References

Sources
 IUCN Database "Global Amphibian Assessment" - Hyla savignyi (Status, distribution map, literature. Data posted May 2006)  Downloaded on 26 February 2008.
 Stöck M, Dubey S, Klütsch C, Litvinchuk SN, Scheidt U, Perrin N. 2008. Mitochondrial and nuclear phylogeny of circum-Mediterranean tree frogs from the Hyla arborea group. Molecular Phylogenetics and Evolution 49: 1019–1024.
 Schneider H. 2009. Hyla savignyi Audouin 1827 - Mittelöstlicher-Laubfrosch. Handbuch der Reptilien und Amphibien Europas. Band 5/II Froschlurche (Anura) II (Hylidae, Bufonidae). Wiebelsheim: AULA-Verlag. pp. 141–172.
 Gvoždík V, Moravec J, Klütsch C, Kotlík P. 2010. Phylogeography of the Middle Eastern tree frogs (Hyla, Hylidae, Amphibia) inferred from nuclear and mitochondrial DNA variation, with a description of a new species. Molecular Phylogenetics and Evolution 55: 1146–1166.

External links
 

savignyi
Amphibians of the Middle East
Amphibians of Iran
Amphibians of Turkey
Amphibians described in 1827
Taxa named by Jean Victoire Audouin
Taxonomy articles created by Polbot